Liu Hao may refer to:

Liu Hao (canoeist) (born 1993), Chinese sprint canoeist
Liu Hao (cyclist) (born 1988), Chinese cyclist
Liu Hao (director) (born 1968), Chinese film director
Liu Hao (footballer) (born 1996), Chinese footballer
Liu Hao (shot putter) (born 1968), Chinese shot putter
Liu Hao (weightlifter) (born 1989), Chinese weightlifter

See also
Hao Lei (born 1978), Chinese actress and singer, sometimes credited as Hao Liu